Rajveer Singh (born 15 March 1959) is an Indian politician, who is a member of Bharatiya Janata Party and has won the 2014 Indian general elections from Etah.

Early life and education
Rajveer Singh was born on 15 March 1959 to Kalyan Singh and Ramvati Devi. He was born in Madhauli, a village in Aligarh district of Uttar Pradesh. Singh's educational qualifications include B.A. and LL.B. degrees from Agra University. He married Premlata Verma on 20 February 1988.

Political career

2002 – 2007: Member, Uttar Pradesh Legislative Assembly
2003 – 2007: Health Minister, Govt. of Uttar Pradesh
2003: Member, Public Accounts Committee
May 2014: Elected to 16th Lok Sabha
1 Sep. 2014 onwards: Member, Standing Committee on Industry
12 Sep. 2014 onwards: Member, Committee on Welfare of Other Backward Classes; Member, Consultative Committee, Ministry of Agriculture

References

External links
 Official biographical sketch in Parliament of India website

1959 births
Living people
India MPs 2014–2019
Lok Sabha members from Uttar Pradesh
People from Aligarh district
Bharatiya Janata Party politicians from Uttar Pradesh
India MPs 2019–present